Aleš Schuster (born 26 October 1981) is a retired Czech football defender who currently plays for Zbrojovka Brno. He made over 100 appearances in the Gambrinus liga. He also played international football at under-21 level for Czech Republic U21.

He later played in Bosnia and Moldova.

References

External links
 Profile at FC Zbrojovka Brno official site
 
 

1981 births
Living people
Czech footballers
Czech Republic youth international footballers
Czech Republic under-21 international footballers
Czech First League players
Moldovan Super Liga players
FC Zbrojovka Brno players
1. SK Prostějov players
FC Dosta Bystrc-Kníničky players
NK Zvijezda Gradačac players
FC Zimbru Chișinău players
FC Dacia Chișinău players
Association football defenders
Czech expatriate footballers
Expatriate footballers in Bosnia and Herzegovina
Expatriate footballers in Moldova
Czech expatriate sportspeople in Moldova
Footballers from Brno